La Patrie is a municipality of about 815 people in Le Haut-Saint-François Regional County Municipality, in Quebec, Canada.  It is located at the base of Mont Mégantic.

Some industries specializing in the field of forestry have settled in La Patrie.  The company Guitabec, which produces guitars under the label Godin, has a manufacturing facility in La Patrie.

Light pollution
Participating in a program initiated and established by the Mont-Mégantic National Park in collaboration with Hydro-Québec, the village of La Patrie has greatly reduced its light pollution, which strongly affects the Mont Mégantic Observatory.

References

External links
 

Municipalities in Quebec
Incorporated places in Estrie
Designated places in Quebec
Le Haut-Saint-François Regional County Municipality